The 1957 Challenge Desgrange-Colombo was the tenth edition of the Challenge Desgrange-Colombo. It included eleven races: all the races form the 1956 edition were retained with no additions. Fred De Bruyne won the second of his three individual championships while Belgium retained the nations championship.

Races

Final standings

Riders

Nations

References

 
Challenge Desgrange-Colombo
Challenge Desgrange-Colombo